Shahreza (also Romanized as Shahrezā and Shahriza; formerly Komsheh, then Qomsheh, also Romanized as Kowmsheh, and Qowmsheh) is a city and capital of Shahreza County, Isfahan Province, Iran.  At the 2006 census, its population was 108,299, in 30,368 families.

Shahreza was selected as the national city of pottery in Iran in 2015. The reason for this choice was the high skill of the artists and the unique soil of this city.

Situation

Shahreza is located 508 km south to Tehran and about 80 km south west to Isfahan and Zard Kooh mountain chain runs from north-west to south-east of the city, enjoying a cold climate.  It is an old city which was first named Qomsheh, but later on its name was changed to Shahreza due to the existence there of the shrine of Shahreza.  The most important tourist attractions are:  Mahyar caravanserai, Shah Reza caravanserai, the Shah Ghandab caves, located south-east of Shahreza, the Poodeh mosque, and Shahreza Imamzadeh. Other tourist attractions include the Amin Abad caravanserai, a Safavid Empire structure in Amin Abad, a village 42 km south of Shahreza.

Shahreza is a strategic city due to having large military bases, rail transportation system, very fertile soil, having the second largest industrial town in Iran (Razi town) and connecting the north to south.

It is interesting that a part of the old Silk Road passed through the Choghad Shahreza area.

History

It was one of the ancient territories of northern Pars (Persia) Satrapy in B.C.
In the north of the county there is canyon of Orchiny (Orchine) that the main Iranian north-south high way passes through. The huge castle of Qomsheh was the latest place constructed by the Safavid Empire before the occupation of the capital Isfahan in the last of Safavid ages when Afghans captured it.

References

Populated places in Shahreza County
Cities in Isfahan Province